Chute or Chutes, may refer to:

 Chute (gravity), a channel down which falling materials are guided
 Chute (landform), a steep-sided passage through which water flows rapidly
 Escape chute, an emergency exit utilized where conventional fire escapes are impractical
 Mail chute, a letter collection device
 Parachute, a device used to slow the motion of an object through an atmosphere by creating drag

People
 Chute (surname)

Places
 Chute, Wiltshire, a parish in England, United Kingdom
 Chute River, a short river in Maine, United States
 Chute, Victoria, a locality in Australia
 Rivière des Chutes (Batiscan River tributary) (Falls River), a river in Mauricie, Quebec, Canada

Facilities and structures
 Pont des Chutes (Falls Bridge), a covered bridge in Abitibi-Témiscamingue, Quebec, Canada
 École secondaire des Chutes (disambiguation) (Falls Secondary); highschools

Television
 Chute! (television programme), a children's programme
 "The Chute", a 1996 episode in the third season of Star Trek: Voyager

Other uses
 Chutes and ladders
 Pilot chute, a small auxiliary parachute used to deploy a main parachute
 Chute (racecourse), a projection extending from either end of an oval-shaped racecourse
 Squeeze chute, a cage for restraining a farm animal
 Chute (in North America), a cattle race, a channel for handling and sorting farm animals

See also

 Shoot (disambiguation)
 Shute (disambiguation)
 
 
 
 Deschutes (disambiguation)